Better Than Sex may refer to:

Better Than Sex (film), a 2000 Australian film
Better Than Sex (book), a 1994 book by Hunter S. Thompson
Better Than Sex (album), a 1999 album by the Red Elvises